In an organic chemistry general sense, an ether lipid implies an ether bridge between an alkyl group (a lipid) and an unspecified alkyl or aryl group, not necessarily glycerol. If glycerol is involved, the compound is called a glyceryl ether, which may take the form of an alkylglycerol, an alkyl acyl glycerol, or in combination with a phosphatide group, a phospholipid.

In a biochemical sense, an ether lipid usually implies glycerophospholipids of various type, also called phospholipids, in which the sn-1 position of the glycerol backbone has a lipid attached by an ether bond and a lipid attached to the sn-2 position via an acyl group. This is in contrast to the more common glycerophospholipids, 1,2-diacyl-sn-glycerol (DAG), in which the glycerol backbone sn-1 and sn-2 positions have acyl chains attached by ester bonds. Ether lipid may also refer to alkylglycerols, such as chimyl (16:0), batyl (18:0), and selachyl (18:1 n-9) alcohols, with an ether-bound lipid on position sn-1, and the other two positions on the glycerol backbone unoccupied.

Types
There are two types of ether lipids, plasmanyl- and plasmenyl-phospholipids. Plasmanyl-phospholipids have an ether bond in position sn-1 to an alkyl group. Plasmenyl-phospholipids have an ether bond in position sn-1 to an alkenyl group, 1-0-alk-1’-enyl-2-acyl-sn-glycerol (AAG). The latter type is called plasmalogens.

Platelet-activating factor (PAF) is an ether lipid which has an acetyl group instead of an acyl chain at the second position (SN-2).

Biosynthesis
The formation of the ether bond in mammals requires two enzymes, dihydroxyacetonephosphate acyltransferase (DHAPAT) and alkyldihydroxyacetonephosphate synthase (ADAPS), that reside in the peroxisome.  Accordingly, peroxisomal defects often lead to impairment of ether-lipid production.

Monoalkylglycerol ethers (MAGEs) are also generated from 2-acetyl MAGEs (precursors of PAF) by KIAA1363.

Functions

Structural
Plasmalogens as well as some 1-O-alkyl lipids are ubiquitous and sometimes major parts of the cell membranes in mammals and anaerobic bacteria. In archaea, ether lipids are the major polar lipids in the cell envelope and their abundance is one of the major characteristics that separate this group of prokaryotes from the bacteria. In these cells, diphytanylglycerolipids or bipolar macrocyclic tetraethers can form covalently linked 'bilayers'.

Second messenger
Differences between the catabolism of ether glycerophospholipids by specific phospholipases enzymes might be involved in the generation of lipid second messenger systems such as prostaglandins and arachidonic acid that are important in signal transduction. Ether lipids can also act directly in cell signaling, as the platelet-activating factor is an ether lipid signaling molecule that is involved in leukocyte function in the mammalian immune system.

Antioxidant
Another possible function of the plasmalogen ether lipids is as antioxidants, as protective effects against oxidative stress have been demonstrated in cell culture and these lipids might therefore play a role in serum lipoprotein metabolism. This antioxidant activity comes from the enol ether double bond being targeted by a variety of reactive oxygen species.

Synthetic ether lipid analogs
Synthetic ether lipid analogs have cytostatic and cytotoxic properties, probably by disrupting membrane structure and acting as inhibitors of enzymes within signal transmission pathways, such as protein kinase C and phospholipase C.

A toxic ether lipid analogue miltefosine has recently been introduced as an oral treatment for the tropical disease leishmaniasis, which is caused by leishmania, a protozoal parasite with a particularly high ether lipid content in its membranes.

See also 
Archaeol

References

External links 
 

Lipids